Vellore Lakshmanaswamy Ethiraj (18 July 1890 – 18 August 1960) was an Indian lawyer and philanthropist who founded Ethiraj College for Women, a college in Chennai, India. He was the first Indian to be appointed as Crown Prosecutor by the British Raj. He also served as the President of the Madras Bar Association.
 
Ethiraj was born on 18 July 1890 in a prosperous aristocratic Tuluva Vellala (Agamudaya)  Mudaliar family of Vellore and was born to Lakshmanaswamy and Ammayi Ammal. V. L. Ethiraj received his undergraduate degree from Presidency College, Chennai and received his law degree from the University of Dublin.

One of Ethiraj's successes was the Lakshmikanthan murder case, which he successfully fought in defense of Tamil actors M. K. Thyagaraja Bhagavathar and N. S. Krishnan. His advocacy was described by C. P. Ramaswami Iyer as "a marvel of the 20th century".

See also
 Education in Chennai

References

External links
 Ethiraj College for Women

20th-century Indian lawyers
1890 births
1960 deaths
Alumni of Trinity College Dublin
Presidency College, Chennai alumni
Tamil lawyers
People from Vellore
Founders of Indian schools and colleges
20th-century Indian educators
Scholars from Chennai
20th-century Indian philanthropists